The 2022–23 Fairfield Stags men's basketball team represented Fairfield University in the 2022–23 NCAA Division I men's basketball season. The Stags, led by fourth-year head coach Jay Young, played their home games at Leo D. Mahoney Arena in Bridgeport, Connecticut as members of the Metro Atlantic Athletic Conference.

Previous season
The Stags finished the 2021–22 season 15–18, 8–12 in MAAC play to finish in a tie for sixth place. As the No. 7 seed in the MAAC Tournament, they defeated No. 10 seed Canisius in the first round, but fell to No. 2 seed Saint Peter’s in the quarterfinals.

Roster

Schedule and results

|-
!colspan=12 style=| Exhibition

|-
!colspan=12 style=| Regular season

|-
!colspan=9 style=| MAAC Tournament

Sources

References

Fairfield Stags men's basketball seasons
Fairfield Stags
Fairfield Stags men's basketball
Fairfield Stags men's basketball